Maureen Ann Collins (born July 7, 1965) is an American actress and comedian who was a member of the ensemble on FOX's sketch comedy series Mad TV. Collins became well known for several characters during her tenure on the show. 

She was a cast member from the 4th season (1998) through the 9th season (2004); she only appeared in fourteen episodes during season nine due to contractual reasons. She returned to Mad TV in the 10th season for one episode, and again when she made an appearance on the 300th episode doing her popular character Lorraine Swanson. Her best known role following her departure from Mad TV was as morning talk show host Joan Callamezzo on the sitcom Parks and Recreation.

The nickname Mo was first given to Collins by the football/drama coach of her junior high school whom she credits with introducing her to improv comedy.

Career

Mad TV
Collins joined the cast of Mad TV at the beginning of season four and stayed until the end of season nine, though only appeared in 14 episodes during the ninth season. Her popular stint on the show led her to come back to guest star in 2005 during Season 10, in 2007 during the 300th episode on season 13, the final episode of season 14 in 2009 and the 20th anniversary reunion special in 2016.

Her most featured and arguably most popular characters were Doreen, the screechy-voiced mother of overgrown toddler Stuart (when Mo Collins left the show, Doreen was written off as being asleep after her latest alcoholic bender or never mentioned); the odd, annoying, confused middle-aged woman Lorraine, and the perpetually unlucky Trina.

Collins also did a multitude of celebrity impressions, including Pamela Anderson, Sandra Bullock, Barbara Bush, Bobbie Battista, Cher, Hillary Clinton, Courteney Cox, Celine Dion, Melissa Etheridge, Judy Garland (as Dorothy Gale from The Wizard of Oz), Jennifer Garner, Jenilee Harrison,  Mary Hart, Teri Hatcher, Goldie Hawn, Jennifer Love Hewitt,  Anne Heche, Catherine Hicks, Paris Hilton, Allison Janney, Jennifer Lopez, Angelina Jolie, Jenny Jones, Jane Kaczmarek (as Lois on a Malcolm in the Middle parody called Malcolm X in the Middle), Jewel, Dina Lohan, 
Andie MacDowell, Madonna, Penny Marshall (as herself and as Laverne DeFazio from Laverne & Shirley), Audrey Meadows, Mary Tyler Moore (in several "modern-day spin" parodies of The Mary Tyler Moore Show), Alanis Morissette, Cynthia Nixon, Sharon Osbourne, Pink, Meg Ryan, Diane Sawyer, Maria Shriver, Shakira, Martha Stewart,  Sally Struthers, Concetta Tomei, Marisa Tomei, Shania Twain, and Catherine Zeta-Jones.

Other work
She has performed her one-woman show, Mo vs. Mo, in various cities, including Los Angeles and Chicago.
 Collins played in the fourth Hollywood Home Game edition of the World Poker Tour for the weSPARK Cancer Support Center. She placed 4th and won $2,500.
She performed with Streetmosphere at the (formerly named) Disney-MGM Studios in the Hollywood Public Works.
 She voices Jan Ors in the Star Wars: Dark Forces: The Collector's Trilogy audio drama.

Personal life 
While attending St. Catherine University for visual arts, Collins was asked to leave in response to an act of graffiti she and her fellow art program friends had committed.

Collins is in remission from a rare form of cancer known as gastrointestinal stromal tumor (GIST). She was diagnosed in spring 2011 when she noticed an odd lump in her abdomen. Collins said, "I would have done nothing about it. I was 44, feeling healthy, everything was going great for me, but my fiancé, Alex said, ‘You need to get it checked out’". Collins learned she had a primary tumor in her duodenum and was able to find a doctor who knew enough about GIST to know that she needed to see a specialist.

Filmography

Film

Television

References

External links

World Poker Tour profile

1965 births
Living people 
American television actresses
American television writers
American voice actresses
American women comedians
Actresses from Minneapolis
20th-century American actresses
21st-century American actresses
American sketch comedians
Screenwriters from Minnesota
20th-century American comedians
21st-century American comedians
Comedians from Minnesota
American women television writers